Karhi Khas is a village in Khuniyaon block and tehsil Itwa in Siddharthnagar district, Uttar Pradesh state of India.

Demographics 
As of 2011 Indian census, the village had a total population of 3552. There were 1676 males and 1876 females. Population within the age group of 0 — 6 years was 729.

References 

Villages in Siddharthnagar district